Blackout is a German film directed by Sebastian Vigg. It was released in 2010.

External links
 

2010 films
German television films
2010s German-language films
Films set in Berlin
2010s German films
Sat.1 original programming